Born This Way is the 1989 debut album by British rap duo the Cookie Crew. The album reached No. 24 on the UK Albums Chart. All three singles released from the album charted on the UK Singles Chart: "Born This Way (Let's Dance)" (No. 23), "Got to Keep On" (No. 17) and "Come On and Get Some" (No. 42).

Critical reception

Chris Murray, reviewer of RPM, left positive overlook on album. He wrote: "Although the name might sound lightweight, this female duo from the UK delivers some aggressive rhymes backed by some fat and funky beats. Thoughtful production avoids the sparseness that plagues the releases of so many lesser known rap artists. Occasional sampling, when used, Is employed primarily as ear candy, rather than being thrust into the spotlight to grab listeners by providing them with something easily recognizable."

Track listing
 "Yo! What's Up" (D. Pryce, S. Banfield, Dazzle) (1:47)
 "From the South" (D. Price, S. Banfield, D. Reeves) (5:33)
 "Come On and Get Some" (G. Bolton, M. Nemley) (4:28)
 "Pick Up on This" (G. Bolton, M. Nemley) (3:47)
 "Feelin' Proud" (D. Pryce, S. Banfield, G. Bolton, M. Nemley) (4:45)
 "Bad Girls (Rock the Spot)" (D. Pryce, S. Banfield) (5:05)
 "Got to Keep On" (D. Pryce, S. Banfield, G. Bolton, M. Nemley) (5:04)
 "Born This Way" (D. Pryce, S. Banfield, G. Bolton, M. Nemley) (3:40)
 "Black Is the Word" (D. Pryce, S. Banfield, Dazzle) (4:56)
 "Places and Spaces for Your Mind" (G. Bolton) (4:51)
 "Rhymes and Careers" (D. Pryce, S. Banfield) (4:07)
 "Dazzle's Thème" (Dazzle) (3:09)
 "Got to Keep On" (B Boy Mix) (D. Pryce, S. Banfield, G. Bolton, M. Nemley) (5:04)
 "Places and Spaces" (G. Bolton) (4:51)

References

1989 debut albums
Cookie Crew albums
London Records albums
FFRR Records albums